The Bachsas Award for Best Female Playback Singer is awarded by the Bachsas (Bangladesh Cholochitra Sangbadik Samity) Awards in Bangladesh. The following is a list of its winners:

Year-wise winners of this award

Here is a list of the award winners and the films for which they won.

Superlatives
Oldest Winner - Runa Laila (60) and Sabina Yasmin (60)
Youngest - Samina Chowdhury (17)

Most Awards
Rumana Islam Kanak Chapa and Sabina Yasmin - 4
Runa Laila and Samina Chowdhury - 3
Baby Naznin - 2

References

Bangladeshi awards